New Sakarya Stadium, officially Sakarya Atatürk Stadyumu, is a stadium in Adapazarı, Sakarya, Turkey. It was opened to public in 2017 with a capacity of 28,113 spectators. It is the new home of Sakaryaspor of the TFF Second League. It replaced the club's old home stadium, Adapazarı Atatürk Stadyumu. The estimated costs are around 150,000,000 ₺

References

Football venues in Turkey
Sports venues completed in 2017
Sports venues in Adapazarı